Break Up is a 1978 Italian romance drama film directed by Enrico Maria Salerno.

It is based on the novel Eutanasia di un amore by Giorgio Saviane.

Plot
A professor in Italy, Paolo, is devastated when his longtime girlfriend, and former student, Sena, leaves him without telling him why or leaving a letter. He's fixated on seeing her again. She leaves for Paris and he sees her with another man, so he heads back to Italy. Sena eventually comes back and they reconcile.

Cast 

Ornella Muti as Ussena (aka Sena)
Tony Musante as Paolo Naviase
Monica Guerritore as The Other Woman
Mario Scaccia as  The Doctor
Laura Trotter as  Patrizia
Gerardo Amato as  Domenico

See also
 List of Italian films of 1978

References

External links

1978 films
Italian romantic drama films
1978 romantic drama films
Films directed by Enrico Maria Salerno
Films based on Italian novels
1970s Italian-language films
1970s Italian films